The 1984 Pittsburgh Panthers football team represented the University of Pittsburgh in the 1984 NCAA Division I-A football season. The Panthers offense scored 178 points while the defense allowed 247 points. At season's end, the Panthers were not ranked in the national polls. The Panthers had their first losing season since 1972.

Schedule

Roster

Coaching staff

Team players drafted into the NFL

Awards and honors
Bill Fralic, Sixth in Heisman Trophy voting

References

Pittsburgh
Pittsburgh Panthers football seasons
Pittsburgh Panthers football